Jude Vandelannoite (born 14 February 1973) is a retired Belgian football player.

Playing career
Vandelannoite began his playing career with K.S.V. Waregem and joined K.V. Kortrijk in 1998. He moved to Greece where he would play for Athinaikos F.C. in Alpha Ethniki before joining Kerkyra F.C. in 2001. Vandelannoite played several seasons for Kerkyra, helping the club earn promotion to the Alpha Ethniki, where he would make three appearances during the 2004–05 season.

Personal
Vandelannoite's brother, Jason is also a professional footballer.

References

1975 births
Living people
Belgian footballers
K.V. Kortrijk players
Athinaikos F.C. players
A.O. Kerkyra players
Panserraikos F.C. players
Expatriate footballers in Greece
Association football midfielders
People from Waregem
Footballers from West Flanders